Mata Khan District is a district of Paktika Province, Afghanistan. The district is within the heartland of the Andar tribe of Ghilji Pashtuns. The estimated population in 2019 was 26,720.

Mata Khan District is located in the northern part of Paktika province, bordering Paktia's Zurmat District and Ghazni's Andar District.

References

Districts of Paktika Province